Constance Mary Villiers-Stuart (née Fielden, 1876 – 1966) was an English author and water-colour painter.

Biography
Villiers-Stuart was brought up at Beachamwell Hall in Norfolk and studied painting in Paris, then married Patrick Villiers-Stuart, a soldier, in 1908 and moved to India, allowing her to collect material for her 1913 book, Gardens of the Great Mughals which launched the historical study of Mughal Gardens.

Chapter XII, on 'Some garden contrasts and a dream' urges respect for Indian design traditions. The 'dream' in the chapter title concerns the design of New Delhi. Her pleas for an Indian town plan had little effect but she had a conversation with Edwin Lutyens and he read her book. Both Lutyens and the viceroy, Lord Hardinge, were impressed with her ideas which was important as they were designing the new capital city for India and the Viceroy's palace. Working with Gertrude Jekyll had given him a sympathy for garden design and the result was the famous Mughal Garden of what is now Rashtrapati Bhavan.

References

Sources
British Library collection summary
Prior, Mary Ann 'An Impulse of Genius', Country Life, 12 September 2018, pp 100 – 104

External links
Gardens of the Great Mughals by C.M. Villiers Stuart Online text.
Rashtrapati Bhavan Official government website.

See also
History of gardening

1876 births
1966 deaths
20th-century English painters
20th-century English women artists
English women non-fiction writers
English watercolourists
British women painters
English non-fiction outdoors writers
Women watercolorists